Koke is an Adamawa language of Chad. Speakers are found in Daguela Canton, Chinguil Sub-prefecture, Guéra Region.

References

Languages of Chad
Bua languages